Lieutenant Colonel Pita Driti is a Fijian soldier.  As of January 2007, he was serving as the Land Force Commander of the Republic of Fiji Military Forces, the third most senior position in the Military.  He played a prominent role in the events that led to and followed the military coup of 5 December 2006.

Driti came to international attention on 6 November 2006, when he publicly accused the Qarase government of smuggling 400 kilograms of Australian arms and mercenaries into Fiji, and called on then-Commissioner of Police Andrew Hughes (an Australian) to answer for it.

In 2010, Driti was dismissed from his military command, arrested, and charged with inciting mutiny. On 13 December 2013, Radio Australia reported that he had been convicted and sentenced to five years' imprisonment, with a minimum non-parole period of four years by judge Paul Madigan.

References

Year of birth missing (living people)
Living people
Fijian soldiers
Fijian prisoners and detainees
I-Taukei Fijian people